Godów  is a village and the seat of Gmina Godów, Wodzisław County, Silesian Voivodeship, southern Poland. It lies near the border with the Czech Republic. The Olza River (German: Olsa) flows through the village's southern outskirts.

Although it does not lie within the historical borders of Cieszyn Silesia, it is a part of Euroregion Cieszyn Silesia.

Well-known Polish actor Franciszek Pieczka was born here.

External links
  Official Gmina Godów website

Villages in Wodzisław County